The term uchronia refers to a hypothetical or fictional time period of our world, in contrast to altogether-fictional lands or worlds. The concept is similar to alternate history, but uchronic times are not easily defined but are placed mainly in some distant or unspecified point before current times, and they are sometimes reminiscent of a constructed world. Some, however, use uchronia to refer to an alternate history.

The word is a neologism from the word utopia (Greek u-topos, meaning "no-place"), replacing topos with chronos (time). It was coined by Charles Renouvier as the title of his 1876 novel Uchronie (L'Utopie dans l'histoire), esquisse historique apocryphe du développement de la civilisation européenne tel qu'il n'a pas été, tel qu'il aurait pu être (Uchronia (Utopia in History), an Apocryphal Sketch of the Development of European Civilization Not as It Was But as It Might Have Been).

The term has been applied to Philip K. Dick's The Man in the High Castle and Philip Roth's The Plot Against America.

Uchronian settings
 Middle-earth/Arda
 Hyborian Age
 Gloriana by Michael Moorcock
 Terre D'Ange, the setting of Kushiel's Legacy
 The World of The Wheel
 Gotham City

See also
 
 Anachronism
 Steampunk

References

External links
www.uchronia.net

Utopian fiction
Words originating in fiction
1870s neologisms
Alternate history websites
Science fiction themes
Speculative fiction